Microsyagrus zeae is a species of leaf beetle of Senegal, described by Gilbert Ernest Bryant in 1948.

References

Eumolpinae
Beetles of Africa
Beetles described in 1948
Insects of West Africa